Currito of the Cross (Spanish:Currito de la Cruz) is a 1926 Spanish silent drama film directed by Alejandro Pérez Lugín and starring Jesús Tordesillas, Manuel González and Elisa Ruiz Romero. The film was adapted from Lugin's own 1921 novel of the same title, set in the bullfighting world. The novel has been made into films several times.

Cast
 Jesús Tordesillas as Currito de la Cruz 
 Manuel González  as Manuel Carmona 
 Elisa Ruiz Romero as Rocío 
 Ana Adamuz as Sor María del Amor Hermoso 
 Faustino Bretaño as Copita 
 Domingo del Moral as Gazuza 
 Elisa Sánchez as Teresa 
 Cándida Suarez as Manuela 'La Gallega' 
 Fernando Fresno as El 'Pintao' 
 José Alba  
 Ángel Alguacil 
 Isabel Almarche as Otra gachí 
 Señor Benítez 
 Antonio Calvache as Romerita 
 Rafael Calvo as Padre Almanzor  
 José Ignacio Caro
 Manuel Centeno 
 Miguel Contreras
 Gregorio Cruzada
 Barón de Kardy 
 Juan Espantaleón 
 Señorita Galcerán 
 Galerín
 Carmen Larrabeiti as Una gachí  
 Alejandro Navarro 
 José Rico Cejudo 
 Víctor Rojas 
 Clotilde Romero as Rufina  
 Duchess of Alba as herself 
Duchess of Dúrcal as herself  
 José García 'El Algabeño'  as himself  
 Alexandre P. Moore as himself  
 Queen Victoria Eugenia as herself

References

Bibliography
 Goble, Alan. The Complete Index to Literary Sources in Film. Walter de Gruyter, 1999.

External links 

1926 films
1926 drama films
Spanish drama films
Spanish silent films
1920s Spanish-language films
Films based on Spanish novels
Films based on works by Alejandro Pérez Lugín
Spanish black-and-white films
Silent drama films